Abel Hovelacque (14 November 1843 – 22 February 1896) was a 19th-century French linguist, anthropologist and politician.

Biography 
Abel Hovelacque was a representative of the naturalistic and anthropological linguistics. He studied languages with Honoré Chavée and comparative anatomy with Paul Broca. He was a member of the Society of Anthropology of Paris. In 1886 Hovelacque and Chavée founded the Revue de Linguistique. That same year, he was elected as a member to the American Philosophical Society.

He was also interested in politics. He became MP for Paris (13th) from 1889 to 1894. He was an extreme Republican.

The  in Paris was named after him as well as two others in Lille and Saint Etienne. The anatomist André Hovelacque (1880-1939) was his son.

Publications 
 Grammaire de la langue zende, Maisonneuve, 1868 Ré-edition Hachette BnF, 2013
 La Linguistique, Reinwald, 1877
 Notre ancêtre, recherches d'anatomie et d'ethnologie sur le précurseur de l'homme, Leroux, 1878
 Études de linguistique et d'ethnographie, Reinwald, 1878
 Les débuts de l'humanité : L'homme primitif contemporain, Doin, 1881
 Les Races humaines, Cerf, 1882

Sources 
 Piet Desmet, La linguistique naturaliste en France (1867-1922). Nature, origine et évolution du langage, Louvain, 1994, p. 224-287. Read online.

References

External links 

 Abel Hovelacque on  Wikisource

1843 births
1896 deaths
Scientists from Paris
Members of the 5th Chamber of Deputies of the French Third Republic
Members of the 6th Chamber of Deputies of the French Third Republic
Linguists from France
French anthropologists
Members of the American Philosophical Society